Adriane Lenox is an American actress, best known for her performances in Broadway theatre. Her performance in the play Doubt: A Parable garnered her the Tony Award for Best Featured Actress in a Play in 2005. She received another Tony Award nomination for After Midnight in 2014.

Early life
Lenox, who is from Tennessee, attended Lambuth College in Jackson, Tennessee and has a degree in drama. She appeared in Ain’t Misbehavin in New York after graduation.

Career

Stage
Lenox appeared in Doubt: A Parable on Broadway in 2005 as Mrs. Muller. She won the Tony Award, Best Performance by a Featured Actress in a Play, for this performance. Other Broadway appearances include Hattie in the Broadway revival of Kiss Me, Kate in 1999, a revue, The Gershwins' Fascinating Rhythm in 1999, 
Caroline, or Change in 2004 as standby for "Caroline Thibodeaux", and Chicago as the Matron (Replacement from August 2007 to October 2007). She appeared on Broadway in After Midnight, in 2013, reprising her role in the New York City Center Encores! staged revue Cotton Club Parade.

She has appeared in many Off-Broadway productions, starting with Beehive in 1986 at the Village Gate (Upstairs). She appeared in the "drama with music", Dinah Was in May 1998 to January 1999 at the Gramercy Theatre in the roles of Maye/Waitress/Violet, and won the Obie Award, Performance (1997–1998).

Film and television
Lenox had a role in the 2009 film The Blind Side, as Denise Oher. Her other film credits include Black Snake Moan (2006), My Blueberry Nights (2007), The Sorcerer's Apprentice (2010), and The Butler (2013).

On television, Lenox has appeared in episodes of Law & Order, Law & Order: Special Victims Unit, Third Watch and Nurse Jackie. She had the recurring roles on Lipstick Jungle, 30 Rock, Damages, Daredevil, The Blacklist, and The Path. She also had a role in the HBO film The Immortal Life of Henrietta Lacks starring Oprah Winfrey.

Stage Credits

Broadway

Touring

Filmography

Film

Television

Awards and nominations

References

External links

 
 
 

Actresses from Memphis, Tennessee
American film actresses
American stage actresses
American television actresses
Drama Desk Award winners
Living people
Tony Award winners
African-American actresses
20th-century American actresses
21st-century American actresses
20th-century African-American women
20th-century African-American people
21st-century African-American women
Year of birth missing (living people)